GNU Pascal (GPC) is a Pascal compiler composed of a frontend to GNU Compiler Collection (GCC), similar to the way Fortran and other languages were added to GCC. GNU Pascal is ISO 7185 compatible, and it implements most of the ISO 10206 Extended Pascal standard.

The major advantage of piggybacking GNU Pascal on the GCC compiler is that it is instantly portable to any platform the GCC compiler supports. However since GPC is a frontend, it does have to adapt if major changes are done to GCC (like a major new version). Typically, new major versions are adopted only slowly (still mostly at 3.x, with 4.x experimental builds). This is probably one of the reasons why developers are looking at a C targeting backend.

In July 2010 a developer publicly asked opinion (it vanished from the web between July 2014 and June 2015) on the future of GNU Pascal, due to developer shortage and maintenance issues as a GCC port. There was a  lively discussion on the maillist where the developers seemed to lean towards reimplementing in C++ with a C code generating backend. The maillist went to sleep again, and  no further releases or announcements about the future course of the project have been made.

Dev-Pascal is a graphical IDE that supports GNU Pascal.

See also 

 Free Pascal

External links 
 Git repo of one of the GPC developers.
 The GNU Pascal (GPC) website
 Standard Pascal – Resources and history of original, standard Pascal
 Pascal User's Group Newsletters – An early Pascal history resource containing many letters from Wirth and others concerning Pascal
 Pascal and its Successors – An article by Niklaus Wirth about the development of Pascal, Modula-2 and Oberon
 Free Pascal Compiler  – A currently maintained alternative to the GNU Pascal Compiler - See also Wikipedia article on Free Pascal

Notes 

Free software
Pascal (programming language) compilers
Pascal programming language family
Procedural programming languages
Statically typed programming languages
Structured programming languages